Matthew Sean Bowen (born November 12, 1976) is a former American football strong safety in the National Football League (NFL). He played college football for the Iowa Hawkeyes, and was drafted by the St. Louis Rams 198th overall in the 2000 NFL Draft, also the last pick before Tom Brady. Bowen currently works as a sports journalist.

High school career
Bowen was an all-state, all-area and all-conference selection as a quarterback at Glenbard West High School in Glen Ellyn, Illinois. He was originally recruited to Iowa as a quarterback after finishing his senior season as team captain and MVP after passing for 1,533 yards and 17 touchdowns, and gaining 1,329 yards and 17 scores on the ground. He also played three seasons of baseball and four seasons of basketball.  His mentor was Hasani Steele, who played in the Rose Bowl with Northwestern University.

College career
Bowen was a four-year letterwinner (1996–99) at Iowa, he started his final two seasons and earned second-team All-America recognition and first-team All-Big Ten honors. He posted a career-high 109 tackles (76 solo) and two INTs as a senior and led the team with 92 tackles (57 solo) and two interceptions as a junior.

NFL career

St. Louis Rams
Matt Bowen was drafted in the sixth round of the 2000 NFL draft by the St. Louis Rams. He was the 198th player to be selected overall and the final player to be selected before the New England Patriots drafted Tom Brady one pick later. He earned St. Louis' Rookie of the Year award after starting at strong safety in two contests and appearing in 16 regular season games. He also saw action in the Rams' Wild Card playoff at New Orleans. He finished the season with 21 tackles (15 solo) and two passes broken up. He also recorded 21 special teams tackles to tie for the club lead.

Green Bay Packers
In 2001, Bowen signed with the Green Bay Packers to provide depth and help to the Packers secondary and special teams. He started the 2001 campaign with St. Louis, but suffered a broken right foot in the season opener and was inactive for the following two games. He was placed on injured reserve on October 3 and was eventually waived on November 6. He played in Green Bay's last five games on defense and special teams, recording four special teams tackles.

In 2002, Bowen appeared in all 16 games, starting six, contributing as a backup safety, a valued special teams contributor as well as a weekly participant in the club's dime package defense. He was named the starter at strong safety during Weeks 4–7 when Antuan Edwards was sidelined with a fractured forearm. He also started at free safety for Darren Sharper in the regular-season finale. He made his first-career postseason start against Atlanta in the NFC Wild Card playoff contest, responding to the challenge with a game- and career-high 15 tackles and two passes defensed. He finished the season with a career-high 42 tackles (27 solo), good for second among reserves. Bowen also added a forced fumble, one interception and seven passes defended.

Washington Redskins
Bowen signed with the Washington Redskins as a restricted free agent from the Green Bay Packers in March 2003. For the first time in his NFL career, Bowen started all 16 games in a season. He finished his campaign with 94 tackles (73 solo), three interceptions, two forced fumbles and two fumble recoveries.

In 2004, Bowen started the first five games at strong safety for the Redskins before suffering a torn ACL on his right knee on a special teams play. He was placed on injured reserve on October 11.

In 2005, Bowen saw action in 13 games, tallied 14 tackles, including 13 solo.

Buffalo Bills
On March 10, 2006, the Washington Redskins released him as an unrestricted free-agent, upon which on March 16, 2006, he signed a two-year, $2 million contract with the Buffalo Bills, which included a $300,000 signing bonus. He appeared in five games for the Bills and was subsequently released on March 1, 2007.

After playing career
Bowen currently works as a sports journalist and NFL writer for ESPN where he provides a former player's perspective on the inner workings of the league.  He previously spent time working for Bleacher Report and the National Football Post website and has been a contributor to the Chicago Tribune website. He was also contributor on the Boers and Bernstein show.

He also earned a master's in writing and publishing from DePaul University.

References

External links
 

1976 births
Living people
American football safeties
Iowa Hawkeyes football players
Buffalo Bills players
Green Bay Packers players
St. Louis Rams players
Washington Redskins players
People from Glen Ellyn, Illinois
Players of American football from Illinois
Sportspeople from DuPage County, Illinois
Sportswriters from Illinois